Diocese of Washington may refer to:

the Episcopal Diocese of Washington
the Roman Catholic Archdiocese of Washington
the Orthodox Church in America Diocese of Washington